Joseph Mell (June 23, 1915 – August 31, 1977) was an American film and television actor. He was known for starring as Burt Stone in the 1971 film The Ski Bum. Mell died in August 1977 in Los Angeles, California, at the age of 62.

Partial filmography 

Hollywood Story (1951) - Sylvester (uncredited)
When Worlds Collide (1951) - Glen Spiro (uncredited)
The Big Night (1951) - Mr. Ehrlich, Store Owner (uncredited)
Just This Once (1952) - Mr. Green (uncredited)
The Sniper (1952) - Joe, Presser (uncredited)
Deadline – U.S.A. (1952) - Lugerman (uncredited)
Singin' in the Rain (1952) - Projectionist (uncredited)
The Atomic City (1952) - Dr. Gus Schwambach (uncredited)
Kid Monk Baroni (1952) - Gino Baroni
Young Man with Ideas (1952) - Municipal Judge (uncredited)
Actor's and Sin (1952) - George Murry
Sally and Saint Anne (1952) - Mr. Shapiro (uncredited)
Monkey Business (1952) - Barber (uncredited)
My Man and I (1952) - Deputy Commissioner (uncredited)
Somebody Loves Me (1952) - Barber (uncredited)
The Prisoner of Zenda (1952) - Railroad Guard (uncredited)
Tangier Incident (1953) - (uncredited)
The Glass Wall (1953) - Musician in Men's Room (uncredited)
The Lady Wants Mink (1953) - Ralph (uncredited)
One Girl's Confession (1953) - Dock's Worker (uncredited)
The 49th Man (1953) - Box of Taffy Man at Penn Station
Siren of Bagdad (1953) - Sultan's Auctioneer (uncredited)
The Lost Planet (1953) - Lah
Flame of Calcutta (1953) - Jowal
The Great Adventures of Captain Kidd (1953) - Greenway (uncredited)
The Big Heat (1953) - Dr. Kane (uncredited)
Easy to Love (1953) - Irving, Sleeping Waiter (uncredited)
Magnificent Obsession (1954) - Dan
Valley of the Kings (1954) - Antique Dealer (uncredited)
A Star Is Born (1954) - Paymaster #2 (uncredited)
Naked Alibi (1954) - Otto Stoltz
The Silver Chalice (1954) - Minor Role (uncredited)
The Prodigal (1955) - Tailor (uncredited)
Ain't Misbehavin' (1955) - Meyer, Beer & Peanut Vendor (uncredited)
Chicago Syndicate (1955) - Markey (uncredited)
One Desire (1955) - Franklin, Lamplighter (uncredited)
All That Heaven Allows (1955) - Mr. Gow, the Butcher (uncredited)
The Spoilers (1955) - Hotel Proprietor (uncredited)
The Harder They Fall (1956) - Ring Announcer (uncredited)
Bigger Than Life (1956) - Frank, the Cab Dispatcher (uncredited)
The Book of Acts Series (1957) - Herod Agrippa
Hot Rod Rumble (1957) - Pops
I Was a Teenage Werewolf (1957) - Dr. Hugo Wagner
God Is My Partner (1957) - Juror (uncredited)
No Time to Be Young (1957) - Donaldson (uncredited)
Jeanne Eagels (1957) - Actors' Equity Representative (uncredited)
Too Much, Too Soon (1958) - Man at Press Party (uncredited)
Damn Yankees (1958) - Reporter (uncredited)
Murder by Contract (1958) - Harry
City of Fear (1959) - Eddie Crown
Imitation of Life (1959) - Watchman (uncredited)
Pillow Talk (1959) - Furniture Dealer (uncredited)
A Fever in the Blood (1961) - Smith Party Worker (uncredited)
Tammy Tell Me True (1961) - Jail Guard (uncredited)
Back Street (1961) - Proprietor
Black Zoo (1963) - Frank Cramer
Move Over, Darling (1963) - Stock Clerk (uncredited)
Looking for Love (1964) - Maitre D' (uncredited)
Kisses for My President (1964) - Reporter (uncredited)
36 Hours (1965) - Lemke
Brainstorm (1965) - Insane Inmate with Flowers (uncredited)
Lord Love a Duck (1966) - Dr. Milton Lippman
The Singing Nun (1966) - Max, TV Technician (uncredited)
Dead Heat on a Merry-Go-Round (1966) - Mr. Barber (uncredited)
The Adventures of Bullwhip Griffin (1967) - Fight Rooter (uncredited)
Thoroughly Modern Millie (1967) - Newspaper Vendor (uncredited)
Doctor, You've Got to Be Kidding! (1967) - Danny Caplow (uncredited)
Point Blank (1967) - Minor Role (uncredited)
Sweet Charity (1969) - Man on Bridge (uncredited)
The Ski Bum (1971) - Burt Stone
Murph the Surf (1975) - Reporter

References

External links 

Rotten Tomatoes profile

1915 births
1977 deaths
People from Chicago
Male actors from Chicago
American male film actors
American male television actors
20th-century American male actors